"World Go Round" is the fourth single from Busta Rhymes' album Back on My B.S. and is produced by Jelly Roll. The song features British singer Estelle, and was released in France on April 6, 2009 by Universal Records due to the heavy rotation of a leaked version (that featured vocals from a different, unidentifiable singer) of the track on the French R&B/hip hop radio station Skyrock. The song was released in the UK on July 13, 2009.

The song uses a riff similar to "Sweet Dreams (Are Made of This)" by Eurythmics.

Music video
The video features both Busta Rhymes and Estelle in various backgrounds surrounded by Japanese, Russian, and Portuguese lettering.

Charts

References

External links
 Busta Rhymes featuring Estelle - World Go Round Official Music Video

2009 singles
Busta Rhymes songs
Estelle (musician) songs
Songs written by Busta Rhymes
2009 songs
Universal Motown Records singles
Songs written by JellyRoll
Song recordings produced by JellyRoll